Manyberries is a hamlet in Alberta, Canada within the County of Forty Mile No. 8.

Climate 

Manyberries experiences a semi-arid climate (Köppen climate classification BSk). Winters are long, cold and dry, while summers are relatively short but very warm. Precipitation is low, with an annual average of 353 mm, and is concentrated in the warmer months. Manyberries is the sunniest spot in Canada, receiving an average of 2,567 hours of sunshine per year.

Demographics 
Manyberries recorded a population of 96 in the 1991 Census of Population conducted by Statistics Canada.

Services 
Manyberries has a community hall, a curling rink, a park with playground equipment, and a hotel with lounge.  Manyberries still has its original Canadian Pacific railway station and a section house, which are both private residences, and are located beside the former Stirling-Weyburn branch line. CPR abandoned the branch line from just east of Stirling to Consul, Saskatchewan in the late 1980s. The tracks were pulled shortly after in early 1990s from Manyberries to Consul. The hamlet also has two oilfield services company that service the nearby Manyberries oilfield.

See also 
List of communities in Alberta
List of hamlets in Alberta

References 

Hamlets in Alberta
County of Forty Mile No. 8